The BMW F800GT is a sport touring motorcycle manufactured by BMW Motorrad from 2013 through 2020. It is the successor to the F800ST, and joins the F-series range which includes the dual-sport F800GS and F700GS, and the naked F800R.

Engine

As with other models in the F-series range, the F800GT uses a  parallel-twin engine, codeveloped by BMW and Rotax. The engine has a 360° firing order which produces an exhaust note reminiscent of BMW's signature air-cooled boxer twins. However, this firing order requires both pistons to move up and down at the same time. To counter the significant inertia produced by the pistons reciprocating, BMW devised a third vestigial connecting rod to a balance weight. The result is a parallel twin with significantly reduced vibration compared to other parallel twin engine designs. The engine is lubricated by a dry sump system.

The engine produces  at 8,000 rpm, but can be specified with a reduced power output of either  for European riders on restricted Category A2 licenses,

Equipment

The F800GT has a low-maintenance belt drive and single sided swingarm.
ABS brakes are standard equipment. In the UK and now the US, factory options include heated grips, tire pressure monitoring system, onboard computer, LED indicators, anti theft alarm system, main centre stand, Automatic Stability Control (ASC), pannier fastenings, comfort seat, low seat, and Electronic Suspension Adjustment (ESA). BMW Motorrad also offer a range of accessories.

New features

References

External links
 F800GT at BMW Motorrad International

F800GT
Belt drive motorcycles
Sport touring motorcycles
Motorcycles powered by straight-twin engines